Mahadik is a surname mainly found in Maharashtra and surrounding states of India. The surname is mainly found among Maratha (caste).
Original kingdom: Bagalkot in Karnataka 

Colour of throne, sign & horse: Bhagawa (Ochre) 

Heraldic sign (Nishan): Rudra on flagpole

Clan goddess (Kuladaivat): Kathyayini 

Clan object (Devak): Pimpal (the peepul tree)

Guru: Malyavant rishi 

History:

Mahadiks are a branch of Salunkhe clan. The Mahadik served under the sultanates of Deccan, and they were chieftains of that kingdom. Later, they served the Maratha Empire and are related to the kings of Satara, Kolhapur and Nagpur's Bhosale branches and also several Maratha clans in caste.

Locations:

The Mahadiks are vessal rulers of several estates in India. Tarale ( Tehsil Patan, Satara ). is their main capital. They arrived here along with the More chiefs of Adilshah to resist the Shirkes. Later, Shrimant Harji Raje Mahadik received grant of Viceroy of Karnataka under Chhatrapati Sambhajis reign. the vatan of sardeshmukhi and nadgoudki of seven villages — Tarle, Nevri (Vita) Chinchani (Ambak) Boposhi, Tondosi, Vajarosi, Marulosi, Kadavekhurd and Ghot — were given by Chhatrapati Shahu to his sister Bhavaibai Mahadik, wife of Shankaraji Raje Mahadik. The no. of places in Princely states of Gwalior, Satara, Nagpur, Kolhapur are alienated to the Mahadik family.

Some of the nobles:

Harji Raje Mahadik, Maratha subhedar of Karnataka, husband of Ambikabai, one of the sisters of King Sambhaji and daughter of King Shivaji.

Babaji Naik Mahadik, sardar of Maratha troops.

Sardar Shankaraji Raje Malharrao Mahadik, Husband of Chhatrapati Shahus Sister Bhavaibai.

Sardar Krishnarao Mahadik, husband of Gwalior chief Jivajirao Scindias Aunt.

f></ref>

Notable people
People with the surname Mahadik, who may or may not be associated with the clan, include: 
 Wamanrao Mahadik, Indian politician belonging to the Shiv Sena party 
 Dhananjay Mahadik, Indian politician belonging to the Bharatiya Janta Party
 Sunil Mahadik, Indian art director 
 Sardar Mahadik Of Gwalior, a noble family from Gwalior, India

See also
 Maratha clan system

References

Social groups of India